Jadaka al-Ghaithu ( "Good Rain Would Befit You") is a muwashshah attributed to Ibn al-Khatīb. It was written as a madīh ( "panegyric") of Sultan Muhammad V of Granada.  ʻAbd al-Ḥalīm Ḥusayn Harrūṭ estimates it was written in the Hijri year 769 (1367-1368) or shortly thereafter, due to the presence of the phrase al-ghanī billah, a moniker used for Muhammad V after a number of victories over the Catholic kingdoms, the last of which occurred around 1367–1368.

Ibn al-Khatīb (1313–1374), an Andalusi poet and polymath, lived between al-Andalus and Morocco as a result of political exile.

It is notable piece in Andalusi literature in general and the repertoire of the muwashshah genre in specific; it has been performed by musicians such as Fairuz.

References 

Arabic poetry
Culture of Al-Andalus
Medieval Arabic poems
14th-century poems